Norfolk & Western Railway Depot is a historic railway depot located at Marion, Smyth County, Virginia. It was built in 1904 by the Norfolk and Western Railway. It is a one-story, stone and brick, Queen Anne style building.  It features detailed porches supported by arching brackets on the street side and iron columns on the other three sides and a slate and shingled hipped roof with dormers.  The building measures 25 feet by 128 feet, and has an attached former ticket office.  The building was converted for office and retain use in 1993–1994.

It was listed on the National Register of Historic Places in 1995. It is located in the Marion Historic District.

References

Norfolk and Western Railway stations
Railway stations on the National Register of Historic Places in Virginia
Queen Anne architecture in Virginia
Railway stations in the United States opened in 1904
Buildings and structures in Smyth County, Virginia
National Register of Historic Places in Smyth County, Virginia
Individually listed contributing properties to historic districts on the National Register in Virginia